Adam Lareef (born 1 July 1980) is a footballer. A striker, he currently plays at the club level for VB Addu.

External links
 

1980 births
Living people
Maldivian footballers
Maldives international footballers
Association football forwards
Footballers at the 2002 Asian Games	
Asian Games competitors for the Maldives